The Boulder Mountains are part of the Rocky Mountains in the western United States. Located in central Idaho, they stretch from a few miles north of Ketchum to north to near Challis, and part of the range is within the Sawtooth National Recreation Area (SNRA) and partially within the Hemingway–Boulders Wilderness.

During the summer, popular hiking destinations include the many trails in the southern section of the Boulder Mountains, where many of the highest peaks are located.  The front of the Boulders are close to and clearly visible from State Highway 75, the Sawtooth Scenic Byway.  Here along the Big Wood River, forests exist along the base of the mountains, while the northern extent of the range has much more sagebrush.

Part of the 1985 movie Pale Rider was filmed in the Boulder Mountains in autumn 1984.

Peaks

Lakes

Gallery

See also

 Sawtooth National Recreation Area
 Sawtooth National Forest

References 

Ranges of the Rocky Mountains
Mountain ranges of Idaho
Landforms of Custer County, Idaho
Landforms of Blaine County, Idaho
Salmon-Challis National Forest
Sawtooth National Forest